The Skidmore News is the official campus newspaper of Skidmore College in Saratoga Springs, New York. It has been published since 1925. It is fully student managed and published every Friday throughout the academic year.

The paper is divided into six sections: News, which features academic news related to Skidmore in addition to wider stories; Op-ed, containing editorial pieces; Features, containing articles concerning culture, food, academia, etc.; Arts & Entertainment, with articles reviewing music, concerts, movies, etc.; Pulp, formerly known as Fun, which largely features comics and other additional content.

In 2002 the Associated Collegiate Press awarded the newspaper first place for a four-year college weekly for special coverage of the community reaction to the September 11 attacks.

In 2010 The Skidmore News stopped printing physical copies and moved entirely online.

References

External links
 The Skidmore News online

Student newspapers published in New York (state)